Triplateia is a genus of flowering plants belonging to the family Caryophyllaceae.

Its native range is Mexico.

Species:
 Triplateia moehringiodes (Moc. & Sessé ex Ser.) Kuntze

References

Caryophyllaceae
Caryophyllaceae genera